Hyper-Luminous X-ray source 1, commonly known as HLX-1, is an intermediate-mass black hole candidate located in the lenticular galaxy ESO 243-49 about 290 million light-years from Earth. The source was discovered at the Institut de Recherche en Astrophysique et Planétologie (IRAP, formerly the CESR), Toulouse, France and gained interest from the scientific community because of strong evidence supporting it as an intermediate-mass black hole. HLX-1 is possibly the remnant of a dwarf galaxy that may have been in a galactic collision with ESO 243-49.

Discovery 
The object was first observed in November 2004, in which it was seen as a source emitting X-rays in the outskirts of the spiral galaxy ESO 243-49 and was catalogued as 2XMM J011028.1-460421, but nicknamed "HLX-1". In 2008, a team of astronomers led by Natalie Webb at the Institut de Recherche en Astrophysique et Planétologie in Toulouse, France, discovered HLX-1 and from the very high X-ray luminosity (~1 x 1042 erg s−1, 0.2-10.0 keV), as well as its X-ray characteristics, proposed that it was an intermediate mass black hole candidate. Follow up analysis using further X-ray, optical  and radio  observations support the intermediate-mass black hole nature. In 2012, further work showed that there was a small cluster of stars amassed around HLX-1, leading Sean Farrell and collaborators to conclude that the black hole was once the galactic center of a dwarf galaxy, which was consumed by ESO 243-49. Farrell remarked, "The fact that there's a very young cluster of stars indicates that the intermediate-mass black hole may have originated as the central black hole in a very low-mass dwarf galaxy. The dwarf galaxy was then swallowed by the more massive galaxy.".

References 

Phoenix (constellation)
Intermediate-mass black holes